Macara interpunctosa is a moth of the Megalopygidae family. It was described by Paul Dognin in 1914.

References

Moths described in 1914
Megalopygidae